Vanguard America is an American white supremacist, neo-Nazi, neo-fascist organization. The organization is also a member of the Nationalist Front. The group gained significant attention after it was revealed that James Alex Fields had marched with them at the Unite the Right rally before being arrested on murder charges. The group has its roots in the alt-right movement.

History 

Vanguard America was founded in 2015, in California. The group was founded and is run by Dillon Hopper. In 2017, Hopper claimed membership of 200+ members. Hopper, a Marine Corps veteran who had served in Afghanistan, also claimed that "many" members were veterans but active duty service members were barred from affiliating with the group until their contract had ended for their "safety". Hopper also states that local branches exist in Arizona, California, Florida, Indiana, Louisiana, Maryland, Massachusetts, New Jersey, Oregon, Pennsylvania, Texas, Virginia, and Washington. In July 2017, it also created a women's division.

The group had a presence in the Unite the Right rally in August 2017. James Alex Fields, who was later responsible for killing a counter protester and injuring 19 others in a vehicle-ramming attack, was seen marching with the group. The leadership later disavowed him, stating that he was not a member of the group. The group took part in the "White Lives Matter" rally in October 2017.

The group supports the Nazi concept of blood and soil. The group has put up racist and anti-Semitic fliers in various towns. On December 18, 2017, its account was suspended by Twitter.

Vanguard America has produced two competing splinter groups, the more popular Patriot Front, founded in August 2017, and the National Socialist Legion, founded in January 2018.

See also 
 Neo-fascism
 Neo-Nazi groups of the United States
 Patriot Front, a splinter group
National Socialist Legion, a splinter group
 White supremacy in the United States

Notes

References 

2015 establishments in California
Alt-right organizations
Neo-Nazi organizations in the United States
Organizations established in 2015
Opposition to feminism